The 8th Filipino Academy of Movie Arts and Sciences Awards Night was held on March 5, 1960, for the Outstanding Achievements for the year 1959.

Biyaya ng Lupa of LVN Pictures was the most nominated film of the year with 12 nominations.  However, it only manages to win 2 awards including the most coveted FAMAS Award for Best Picture.  Kamandag of Sampaguita Pictures won the most awards (7 wins), including best actor (Van de Leon), Best director (Jose De Villa) and Best Supporting Actress (Marlene Dauden).

Biyaya ng Lupa was also screened and nominated for Golden Bear at the 10th Berlin International Film Festival

Awards

Major Awards
Winners are listed first and highlighted with boldface.

Special Awardee

International Prestige Award of Merit 
El Legado

References

External links
FAMAS Awards 

FAMAS Award
FAMAS
FAMAS